The Astra modelo 400  was a Spanish service pistol produced by weapons manufacturer Astra-Unceta y Cia SA. as a replacement for the Campo-Giro 1913/1916, which had also been chambered in 9mm Largo. It was the standard issue sidearm in the Spanish Army during the Spanish Civil War and also saw service in Germany during World War II. 

The pistol was mass-produced and many examples still exist today. The Spanish Navy, along with the German Luftwaffe and the Chilean Navy primarily used the smaller variant Astra 300 and the Wehrmacht later altered the Astra 400 into the Astra 600 to better handle the 9mm Luger. The 400 was considered heavy as in order to handle the power of the 9mm Largo round in a blowback action the 400 had a reinforced slide and tough spring.

It gained fame among Spanish African and Civil War veterans as a strong and reliable pistol. This was especially so under mud and sand conditions, due to the nature of the internal hammer, protected from external elements and debris.

Although an underrated firearm in the past by some American gun experts, the pistol has become a unique collector piece. It is also an accurate service pistol for target shooting, due to its lower axis over the hand. 

A powerful pistol, original 9mm largo Spanish military loads were comparable with .38 Super factory loads.

History
The Spanish War Ministry of King Alfonso XIII began tests in 1919 to replace the Campo Giro pistol as the standard military sidearm.  The 9mm Largo Astra modelo 400, patented by Pedro Careaga, was selected for the Spanish Army in August 1921, and was also adopted by other Spanish Armed forces. Astra pistols were supplied to Republican Spain and to the Basque government which controlled the plant until the Bombing of Guernica in April, 1937.  Astra pistols were subsequently produced for Nationalist troops, while Republican forces made approximately 22,000 copies of the pistol in Terrassa (marked F. Ascaso) and Valencia (marked RE for Republica Española).  Astra production after the civil war was for Nationalist troops except serial numbers 92851 to 98850 for Nazi Germany.  Astra continued private production until 1950 even though in 1946 the Spanish military adopted the Star Model A as the standard sidearm. Spanish military inventories were sold to civilian wholesalers between 1956 and 1965. A total of around 106,175 pistols were produced.

Mechanics
The Astra 400 is heavy compared to many contemporary service pistols of the time like the Tokarev TT-33 but is similar in weight and length to the Colt 1911. The Astra 400 was designed to be safe to fire with a simple blowback action unaided by any breech-locking devices. This is only possible with a heavy slide and strong recoil spring. It was fitted with an internal hammer which was considered very hard to cock. The pistol also featured grooved finger grips and left sided combined slide lock/safety behind the trigger guard. The original design was chambered in 9mm Largo, but later variants would be chambered differently so as to better fulfill different military needs.

Variants
Astra made some experimental variants of the 400 chambered in 7.63mm Mauser, .32 ACP, and .30 Luger. 9mm Largo rounds were often in short supply outside of Spain. Though several other 9mm cartridges like the 9mm Luger and .380ACP could feed, be fired, and eject successfully, this was a capability of questionable use where 9mm Largo ammunition was available as chronograph tests show considerably higher muzzle velocities and thus energies with the 9mm Largo than 9mm Luger and .380. The 9×23mm Steyr cartridge is more similar in dimension to the 9mm Largo than both the 9mm Luger and .380 and performs better as well.

The Astra 600, a slightly shorter and lighter version of the Astra 400 that is chambered in 9mm Luger, was later developed for export sales, primarily to Nazi Germany. A smaller variant for both domestic and export sales, the Astra 300, was offered in .32 ACP and .380 ACP. By the end of 1947 171,300 were made and were primarily issued to security forces of the Spanish Navy and the German Luftwaffe.

Users
 : Astra Models 300 and 400

: Used in small numbers during the Second Sino-Japanese War.
: Astra Model 300 used by Finnish Civil Guard during World War 2.
 Many Astra pistols were smuggled into France by the black market and were sold to the French Resistance. Some were also used by the Vichy Milice and also used by the Spanish Maquis who brought them to France after fleeing Spain after the Civil War.
 Various Astra pistols chambered in 9mm parabellum and exported to Nazi Germany and used during WW2 by Wehrmacht and Waffen SS. 9mm Largo were also trophies for German volunteers of the Nationalist Army in the Spanish Civil War.
 Astra pistols were prized war trophies for Royal Italian Army soldiers who served in the Spanish Civil War and were used during WW2.

:Metropolitan Montevideo police

Notes

References

External links
 Astra mod. 400 Pictorial

Semi-automatic pistols of Spain
9mm Largo firearms
Semi-automatic pistols